Otis Webb Brawley  is an American physician and the Bloomberg Distinguished Professor of Oncology and Epidemiology at Johns Hopkins University.  He served as Chief Medical and Scientific Officer and Executive Vice President of the American Cancer Society from July 2007 to November 2018.  He is board certified in internal medicine and medical oncology and is a Master of the American College of Physicians, Fellow of the American Society of Clinical Oncology, and a Fellow of the American College of Epidemiology. He is a member of the Institute of Medicine now known as the National Academy of Medicine.

Biography
Brawley is a graduate of University of Chicago, Pritzker School of Medicine. He completed a residency in internal medicine at University Hospitals of Cleveland, Case-Western Reserve University, and a fellowship in medical oncology at the National Cancer Institute. As the chief medical and scientific officer and executive vice president of the American Cancer Society, Brawley is responsible for promoting the goals of cancer prevention, early detection, and quality treatment through cancer research and education. He is Professor of haematology, medical oncology, medicine and epidemiology at Emory University. He is also a medical consultant to the Cable News Network (CNN). From 2001 to 2007, he was Medical Director of the Georgia Cancer Center for Excellence at Grady Memorial Hospital in Atlanta, and Deputy Director for cancer control at the Winship Cancer Institute at Emory University. He has also previously served as a member of the Society's Prostate Cancer Committee, co-chaired the U.S. Surgeon General's Task Force on Cancer Health Disparities, and filled a variety of positions at the National Cancer Institute (NCI), most recently serving as Assistant Director. Brawley serves on the Board of Regents of the Uniformed Services University of the Health Sciences. He has served as a member of the Food and Drug Administration Oncologic Drug Advisory Committee, the Centers for Disease Control and Prevention Breast and Cervical Cancer Early Detection and Control Advisory Committee and chaired the NIH Consensus Panel on the Treatment of Sickle Cell Disease. Among numerous other awards, he was a Georgia Cancer Coalition Scholar and received the Key to St. Bernard Parish for his work in the U.S. Public Health Service in the aftermath of Hurricane Katrina. In 2011, Brawley joined the International Prevention Research Institute as Senior Research Fellow. In 2022, he was listed on STAT's inaugural STATUS List, "the most definitive and consequential accounting of important and impactful leaders in the life sciences."

Brawley has published more than 200 scientific articles and he has written a book, How We Do Harm: A Doctor Breaks Ranks About Being Sick in America.

Brawley works to reduce overscreening of medical conditions.

Awards 
Brawley's awards include:

 2022 STAT's STATUS List
 2019 American Medical Association (AMA) Distinguished Service Award
 2019 University of Chicago Alumni Professional Achievement Award
 2018 Martin D. Abeloff Award for Excellence in Public Health and Cancer Control, Maryland State Council of Cancer Control
 2015 Elected Member of the National Academy of Medicine
 2015 Named a Master of the American College of Physicians
 2013 Special Recognition Award from the American Society of Clinical Oncology
 2009 AACR-Minorities in Cancer Research Jane Cooke Wright Lecture
 Fellow of the American Society of Clinical Oncology
 Fellow of the American College of Epidemiology

Publications 
Brawley has more than 30,000 citations in Google Scholar and an h-index of 73.

 PubMed Citations
 Google Scholar Citations
 Highly Cited Articles (more than 1000 citations)

 2011 with R Siegel, E Ward, A Jemal, Cancer statistics, 2011: the impact of eliminating socioeconomic and racial disparities on premature cancer deaths, in CA: A Cancer Journal for Clinicians. Vol. 61, nº 4; 212-236.
 2012 with MM Center, A Jemal, J Lortet-Tieulent, E Ward, J Ferlay, F Bray, International variation in prostate cancer incidence and mortality rates, in European Urology. Vol. 61, nº 6; 1079-1092.
 2015 with KC Oeffinger, ETH Fontham, R Etzioni, A Herzig, JS Michaelson, YCT Shih, LC Walter, TR Church, CR Flowers, SJ LaMonte, AMD Wolf, C DeSantis, J Lortet-Tieulent, K Andrews, D Manassaram-Baptiste, D Saslow, RA Smith, R Wender, Breast cancer screening for women at average risk: 2015 guideline update from the American Cancer Society, in JAMA. Vol. 314, nº 15; 1599-1614.
 2012 with PB Bach, JN Mirkin, TK Oliver, CG Azzoli, DA Berry, T Byers, GA Colditz, MK Gould, JR Jett, AL Sabichi, RSmith-Bindman, DE Wood, A Qaseem, FC Detterbeck, Benefits and harms of CT screening for lung cancer: a systematic review, in JAMA. Vol. 307, nº 22; 2418-2429.
 2010 with GL Andriole, DG Bostwick, LG Gomella, M Marberger, F Montorsi, CA Pettaway, TL Tammela, C Teloken, DJ Tindall, MC Somerville, TH Wilson, IL Fowler, RS Rittmaster, Effect of dutasteride on the risk of prostate cancer, in New England Journal of Medicine. Vol. 362; 1192-1202.

References

External links
 Article written by Otis W. Brawley in the Washington Post
 Speaker of the 22nd Annual International Symposium of the Hunter College 
 Interview of Dr Otis Brawley, February 2011
 Otis Brawley keynote speech to the Association of Health Care Journalists annual conference, April 21, 2012

Living people
Cancer researchers
American oncologists
Pritzker School of Medicine alumni
American Cancer Society people
University of Detroit Jesuit High School and Academy alumni
20th-century American scientists
Year of birth missing (living people)
20th-century American physicians
21st-century American physicians
Fellows of the American College of Epidemiology
Members of the National Academy of Medicine